The Roman Catholic Diocese of Riobamba is a Roman Catholic diocese located in Riobamba, Ecuador. This diocese was erected on 29 December 1862 as the Diocese of Bolivar from territory of the Diocese of Cuenca. On 25 August 1955, it was renamed the Diocese of Riobamba. 

On 28 April 2021, Pope Francis accepted the resignations of Bishop Julio Parrilla Díaz and of Coadjutor Bishop elect Gerardo Miguel Nieves Loja. The diocese had been the subject of charges of financial mismanagement and notable failures of priests to maintain their vows of celibacy. The former auxiliary bishop of Cuenca, Bolivar Piedra, was named Bishop on 21 September 2022.

Bishops
Bishops of Bolivar
José Ignacio Ordóñez (22 June 1866 – 1879)
Arsenio Andrade (13 November 1884 – 1907)
Andrés Machado, S.J. (16 November 1907 – 26 April 1916), appointed Bishop of Guayaquil
Ulpiano Maria Perez y Quinones (7 December 1916 – 27 December 1918)
Carlos María Javier de la Torre (21 August 1919 – 20 December 1926), appointed Bishop of Guayaquil; future Cardinal
Alberto Maria Ordóñez Crespo (5 December 1930 – 7 January 1954)
Leonidas Eduardo Proaño Villalba (18 March 1954 – 25 August 1955); see below
Bishops of Riobamba
Leonidas Eduardo Proaño Villalba (25 August 1955 – 20 March 1985); see above
Victor Alejandro Corral Mantilla (4 September 1987 – 28 February 2011)
Julio Parrilla Díaz (12 January 2013 – 28 April 2021)
Bolivar Piedra (21 September 2022 – present)

Other priest of this diocese who became bishop
Raúl Eduardo Vela Chiriboga, appointed Auxiliary Bishop of Guayaquil in 1972; later cardinal

References

External links
Catholic Hierarchy
GCatholic.org
Catholic Encyclopedia

Roman Catholic dioceses in Ecuador
Roman Catholic Ecclesiastical Province of Quito
Riobamba
Riobamba
1862 establishments in Ecuador